Dehloran County is in Ilam province, Iran. The capital of the county is the city of Dehloran. At the 2006 census, the county's population was 58,993 in 11,376 households. The following census in 2011 counted 66,399 people in 14,852 households. At the 2016 census, the county's population was 65,630 in 16,959 households.

Dehloran County is mostly populated by the Kurdish Kurdali tribe and has an Arab and Lur minority.

Administrative divisions

The population history and structural changes of Dehloran County's administrative divisions over three consecutive censuses are shown in the following table. The latest census shows four districts, eight rural districts, and four cities.

References

 

Counties of Ilam Province